Riyakhun (also Romanized as Rīyākhūn and Rīākhūn; also known as Rīākhān) is a village in Zazeran Rural District, in the Central District of Falavarjan County, Isfahan Province, Iran. At the 2006 census, its population was 1,482, in 379 families.

References 

Populated places in Falavarjan County